Adenosquamous carcinoma is a type of cancer that contains two types of cells: squamous cells (thin, flat cells that line certain organs) and gland-like cells. It has been associated with more aggressive characteristics when compared to adenocarcinoma in certain cancers. It is responsible for 1% to 4% of exocrine forms of pancreas cancer.


Diagnosis

Light microscopy shows a combination of gland-like cells and squamous epithelial cells. On immunohistochemistry, it is typically positive for CK5/6, CK7 and p63, and negative for CK20, p16 and p53. On genetic testing, KRAS and p53 are typically altered.

References

External links 

 Adenosquamous carcinoma entry in the public domain NCI Dictionary of Cancer Terms

Carcinoma
Infectious causes of cancer